Laidy Yorveys Gómez Flórez (born 12 December 1981) is a Venezuelan politician, a member of Democratic Action and a former governor of Táchira.

Gómez was born in Rubio, Junín Municipality, Táchira, Venezuela, and became the governor of Táchira in 2017.

References 

1981 births
Living people
Governors of Táchira
People from Rubio, Venezuela
Democratic Action (Venezuela) politicians
Members of the National Assembly (Venezuela)
Venezuelan women lawyers
21st-century Venezuelan women politicians
21st-century Venezuelan politicians
Women state governors of Venezuela